Rory Leidelmeyer is an American bodybuilder who competed in the 1970s and 1980s. He is a former Mr. America and trained former football player Tony Mandarich. He also appeared in the Shaquille O'Neal film Kazaam (1996).

References

External links
Official Rory Leidelmeyer Website
Rory Leidelmeyer Gallery

Living people
American people of Indonesian descent
Year of birth missing (living people)